David Cadieux (born November 25, 1974) is a Canadian professional boxer. As an amateur, he won the silver medal at the 2002 Commonwealth Games.

Career
As a professional boxer, on May 12, 2006, at the Aréna Jacques Plante, Cadieux won the Canadian belt stopping former Canuck champion Patrice L'Heureux at the very beginning of the 7th round by a powerful left hook on the side of the head dropping him down for the 4th and last time of the evening. In 2007 he lost the national title to Raymond Olubowale by KO.

Professional boxing record

|-
| style="text-align:center;" colspan="8"|17 Wins (12 knockouts, 5 decisions), 3 Losses (1 knockout, 2 decisions), 1 No Contest 
|-  style="text-align:center; background:#e3e3e3;"
|  style="border-style:none none solid solid; "|Result
|  style="border-style:none none solid solid; "|Record
|  style="border-style:none none solid solid; "|Opponent
|  style="border-style:none none solid solid; "|Type
|  style="border-style:none none solid solid; "|Round
|  style="border-style:none none solid solid; "|Date
|  style="border-style:none none solid solid; "|Location
|  style="border-style:none none solid solid; "|Notes
|- align=center
|Loss
|
|align=left| Raymond Olubowale
|TKO
|6
|21/09/2007
|align=left| Trois-Rivieres, Quebec, Canada
|align=left|
|-
|Win
|
|align=left| Wade Lewis
|TKO
|1
|03/08/2007
|align=left| Montreal, Quebec, Canada
|align=left|
|-
|Loss
|
|align=left| Josue Blocus
|SD
|12
|12/05/2007
|align=left| Montreal, Quebec, Canada
|align=left|
|-
|Win
|
|align=left| Ray Lunsford
|TKO
|1
|14/04/2007
|align=left| Montreal, Quebec, Canada
|align=left|
|-
|Win
|
|align=left| Ross Puritty
|UD
|10
|10/02/2007
|align=left| Montreal, Quebec, Canada
|align=left|
|-
|Win
|
|align=left| Patrice L'Heureux
|UD
|12
|18/11/2006
|align=left| Trois-Rivieres, Quebec, Canada
|align=left|
|-
|Win
|
|align=left| Rogerio Lobo
|RTD
|4
|23/06/2006
|align=left| Montreal, Quebec, Canada
|align=left|
|-
|Win
|
|align=left| Patrice L'Heureux
|KO
|7
|12/05/2006
|align=left| Shawinigan, Quebec, Canada
|align=left|
|-
|Win
|
|align=left| Matthew Greer
|UD
|8
|11/02/2006
|align=left| Montreal, Quebec, Canada
|align=left|
|-
|Win
|
|align=left| Marcus McGee
|UD
|8
|10/12/2005
|align=left| Montreal, Quebec, Canada
|align=left|
|-
|Win
|
|align=left| Demetrice King
|UD
|8
|01/10/2005
|align=left| Trois-Rivieres, Quebec, Canada
|align=left|
|-
|Win
|
|align=left| Clinton Boldridge
|TKO
|2
|18/06/2005
|align=left| Montreal, Quebec, Canada
|align=left|
|-
|Win
|
|align=left| Raymond Olubowale
|KO
|5
|16/04/2005
|align=left| Victoriaville, Quebec, Canada
|align=left|
|-
|Win
|
|align=left| Vernon Woodward
|KO
|1
|12/03/2005
|align=left| Montreal, Quebec, Canada
|align=left|
|-
|Win
|
|align=left| Marcelo Aravena
|TKO
|2
|03/03/2005
|align=left| Montreal, Quebec, Canada
|align=left|
|-
|Win
|
|align=left| William Cook
|TKO
|1
|12/02/2005
|align=left| Montreal, Quebec, Canada
|align=left|
|-
|Win
|
|align=left| Robert Murphy
|KO
|1
|17/12/2004
|align=left| Montreal, Quebec, Canada
|align=left|
|-
|Win
|
|align=left| Matt Anderson
|TKO
|3
|13/11/2004
|align=left| Montreal, Quebec, Canada
|align=left|
|-
|Win
|
|align=left| Monte Cutshall
|KO
|1
|09/10/2004
|align=left| Montreal, Quebec, Canada
|align=left|
|-
|Loss
|
|align=left| Claudio Rasco
|SD
|4
|29/09/2004
|align=left| Montreal, Quebec, Canada
|align=left|
|-
|No Contest
|
|align=left| Daryl Smith
|NC
|2
|11/09/2004
|align=left| Montreal, Quebec, Canada
|align=left|
|}

References

External links
 DAVID'S web page

1974 births
Boxers at the 2002 Commonwealth Games
Boxers at the 2003 Pan American Games
Pan American Games competitors for Canada
Commonwealth Games silver medallists for Canada
French Quebecers
Heavyweight boxers
Living people
People from Saint-Jean-sur-Richelieu
Sportspeople from Quebec
Canadian male boxers
Commonwealth Games medallists in boxing
Medallists at the 2002 Commonwealth Games